Cloverdale—Langley City is a federal electoral district in British Columbia. It encompasses a portion of B.C. previously included in the electoral districts of Langley, South Surrey—White Rock—Cloverdale and Fleetwood—Port Kells.

Cloverdale—Langley City was created by the 2012 federal electoral boundaries redistribution and was legally defined in the 2013 representation order. It came into effect upon the call of the 42nd Canadian federal election, scheduled for October 2015.

Demographics

According to the Canada 2011 Census; 2013 representation

Languages: 78.2% English, 6.2% Punjabi, 2.0% Chinese, 1.5% Tagalog, 1.4% Korean, 1.3% German, 1.2% French, 1.2% Spanish 
Religions: 48.4% Christian (14.8% Catholic, 4.6% United Church, 3.6% Anglican, 2.6% Pentecostal, 2.4% Baptist, 2.2% Lutheran, 1.2% Presbyterian, 16.9% Other), 7.4% Sikh, 1.5% Buddhist, 1.2% Muslim, 1.1% Hindu, 39.8% No religion 
Median income (2010): $34,719 
Average income (2010): $40,984

Members of Parliament

This riding has elected the following members of the House of Commons of Canada:

Election results

 
 
 

Source: theglobeandmail.com

Notes

References

British Columbia federal electoral districts
Federal electoral districts in Greater Vancouver and the Fraser Valley
Langley, British Columbia (city)
Langley, British Columbia (district municipality)
Politics of Surrey, British Columbia
Politics of Langley, British Columbia (city)